Seoul Mate is a South Korean reality program on tvN

Season 1 was televised on tvN and O'live Mondays at 8:10 pm (KST) starting November 17, 2017 and ended on August 25, 2018.

Season 2 was televised on tvN Mondays at 8:10 pm (KST) starting December 10, 2018 and ended on March 25, 2019.

Season 3 is televised on tvN Mondays at 8:10 pm (KST) starting July 1, 2019.

Synopsis 
This is a show where non-Koreans who loves or interested in visiting South Korea can apply to join the programme. In the programme, the selected few participants gets to stay in a Korean celebrity house who will be their host for the next 2 to 3 days.

Cast member

Ratings 
 Ratings listed below are the individual corner ratings of Seoul Mate. (Note: Individual corner ratings do not include commercial time, which regular ratings include.)

Season 1

Season 2

Season 3

References

External links 
 Official website for Season 1 
 Official website for Season 2 
 Official website for Season 3 

South Korean variety television shows
South Korean television shows
2017 South Korean television series debuts
TVN (South Korean TV channel) original programming
South Korean reality television series
Korean-language television shows